Kalarko–Mirniny is a Glottolog classification that includes:

 Kalarko language
 Mirniny language

References

Glottolog languages that correspond to more than one Wikipedia article